The First Ten Years may refer to:
The Singles: The First Ten Years, a 1982 album by ABBA 
The First Ten Years (Joan Baez album)
The Best of Elvis Costello: The First 10 Years
The First Ten Years (Iron Maiden album)
The First Ten Years: The Videos, a video album by Iron Maiden
The First Ten Years (Gabin album)
The First Ten Years (Vicious Rumors video album)
Greatest Hits: The First Ten Years, an album by Vanessa Williams
For the Record: The First 10 Years
The First Ten Years, a 1990 album by Windham Hill
The First Ten Years, a 1999 album by Shawn Mullins
The First Ten Years, a 1994 album by Schooner Fare
The First Ten Years, an album by Le Trio Joubran

See also
 First Twenty Years (disambiguation)